Bailey Level is a former gold mine and iron mine in the Forest of Dean, England. The mine and surface features are currently managed by volunteer members of Lea Bailey Light Railway Society.

The gold mine was started by the Chastan Syndicate in 1906. Shares were offered at £1 each. Some 75,000 shares were sold. However, test workings at Lea Bailey and nearby Staple Edge concluded that the small amount of gold present could not be extracted economically and the syndicate was wound up in 1908.

References

External links
Bailey Level at Aditnow
Lea Bailey Light Railway

Gold mines in England
Underground mines in England
Mines in Gloucestershire